The Yeshiva Boys Choir also known as (YBC) is a contemporary Jewish religious music boys choir. The choir is conducted by Yossi Newman, and their songs are composed, arranged and produced by Eli Gerstner. There are more than 50 children in the group. There were identical twins who sung in the group at one point, as well as a Yemenite (Temani) child.

Quickly after their first album, they became well known around the Orthodox Jewish community. They went on to release many hit songs, and then toured the world putting on shows. Some of their greatest hits include "V'ohavta" (2005), "Shabichi" (2007), "Daddy Come Home" (2011), "Ah Ah Ah (Ashrei)" (2011), and "Adir" (2014). They have also found success with the Hanukkah songs "Mizmor Shir" (2011), "Shehechiyanu" (2011), and "Those Were the Nights" (2011). Today, they are beloved by many around the world.

Discography
 YBC 1 - Kol Hamispallel (2003)
 YBC 2 - V'ohavta L'Reacha Komocha (2005)
 YBC Live! (2005)
 YBC 3 - Shabichi (2007)
 YBC 4 - Sh'moy Shel Melech (2009)
 YBC Live! 2
 YBC Live! 3
 YBC 5 - Chanukah (2010)
 YBC Live! 4 (2011)
 Amein Amein Amein (A cappella) (2012)
 YBC 6 - Modeh Ani (2014)
 YBC - TOV (2017)
 Our Greatest Hits (2020)

Singles List 
 Ah Ah Ah (Ashrei) (2011)
 Ad Olam (feat. Benny Friedman & The Chevra) (2013)
 Yihalilu (2014)
 Tov (2017)
 Mi X6 (2019)
 UL'SHALOM (2021)

References

External links 
 

American choirs
Choirs of children
Choirs in New York (state)
Boys' and men's choirs
Jewish musical groups
Orthodox pop musicians